The 2001–02 Cypriot Fourth Division was the 17th season of the Cypriot fourth-level football league. AEM Mesogis won their 1st title.

Format
Fifteen teams participated in the 2001–02 Cypriot Fourth Division. All teams played against each other twice, once at their home and once away. The team with the most points at the end of the season crowned champions. The first three teams were promoted to the 2002–03 Cypriot Third Division and the last four teams were relegated to regional leagues.

Point system
Teams received three points for a win, one point for a draw and zero points for a loss.

Changes from previous season
Teams promoted to 2001–02 Cypriot Third Division
 Sourouklis Troullon
 PEFO Olympiakos
 ATE PEK Ergaton

Teams relegated from 2000–01 Cypriot Third Division
 Ethnikos Latsion FC
 AMEP Parekklisia
 THOI Avgorou

Teams promoted from regional leagues
 Orfeas Nicosia
 AEM Mesogis
 Frenaros FC
 Proodos Kaimakliou

Teams relegated to regional leagues
 APEP Pelendriou
 AEK Kakopetrias
 Doxa Paliometochou

Notes: 
AEK Kythreas were additionally admitted to participate in the 2001–02 Cypriot Fourth Division as they were a refugee team (originally located in Northern Cyprus); they were relegated to the amateur divisions after 1999–2000 season and suspended their operations in 2000. They resumed operations in 2001 and according to a specific regulation, the refugees football clubs that were resuming their operations could participate in the Cypriot Fourth Division. So, AEK's application to participate in the fourth division was accepted.
Anagennisi Prosfigon Lemesou withdrew for 2001–02 Cypriot Fourth Division.

League standings

Results

See also
 Cypriot Fourth Division
 2001–02 Cypriot First Division
 2001–02 Cypriot Cup

Sources

Cypriot Fourth Division seasons
Cyprus
2001–02 in Cypriot football